Landhi Railway Station is one of three major railway stations in Karachi, Pakistan. It is situated in the east end of the city near Quaidabad in Landhi and serves as a major stop along the Karachi–Peshawar Railway Line.

History
Landhi Station at one point served as the junction for the Landhi–Korangi Branch Line and served as the terminus station for the Karachi Circular Railway - Main Line between 1969 and 1999.

Facilities
Landhi Station is equipped with current reservation facilities.

Services
The following trains stop at Landhi station:

Incidents
 2016 Karachi Rail Crash: On 3 November 2016, near this station two trains collided at this station resulting in 21 deaths and 65 injuries.

See also
 Pakistan Railways
 List of railway stations in Pakistan
 Karachi Circular Railway

References

External links
 Time Table for Landhi Railway Station
 Lāndhi Railway Station: Pakistan Geographical Names

Railway stations in Karachi
Landhi Town
Railway stations on Karachi Circular Railway
Railway stations on Karachi–Peshawar Line (ML 1)